was a Japanese speculator-turned politician.

Born to a peasant family in Chiba Prefecture, Suzuki became an elementary school teacher after graduating from a normal school. His uncle's success in the booming stock market during the Russo-Japanese War interested him in equity investment. He left teaching to become a market speculator at age 28. In the market crash of 1920, he earned approximately three million yen by short-selling of stocks, when the average monthly salary for college graduates was no more than forty yen.

Suzuki successfully ran for the Lower House election in 1920. Backed by the Rikken Seiyūkai, he was reelected for five consecutive terms.

References 

Japanese schoolteachers
Japanese stock traders
Politicians from Chiba Prefecture
1882 births
1978 deaths
Members of the House of Representatives (Empire of Japan)
Rikken Seiyūkai politicians
Japanese investors